Kuwait Central Blood Bank is the only blood bank in Kuwait being operated by the government. It is located in Jabriya behind Mubarak Al-Kabeer Hospital.

History and profile
It was established and founded on 25 May 1965 by Abdulaziz Al-Bashir, haematologist. It became an accredited member with the American Association of Blood Banks (AABB) in 1989 and has been a participant of the college of American Pathologists (CAP) since 1994.

References

External links
 Official website

1965 establishments in Kuwait
Government agencies established in 1965
Blood banks
Buildings and structures in Kuwait City
Medical and health organizations based in Kuwait